As Good as Dead is a 1995 television film written, produced, and directed by Larry Cohen. The psychological thriller, originally broadcast on USA Network, stars Crystal Bernard, Judge Reinhold and Traci Lords. The film was released on VHS in 1998.

Plot
Nicole (Traci Lords) is a makeup artist with an ulcer who befriends Susan (Crystal Bernard) at a club. Susan harbors a sadness over the death of her mother and the fact that her father left when she was two years old. Nicole takes Susan to her house where she shows her the location of the spare key and lends her some clothes, saying that she will even begin to feel different after wearing them for a while. Nicole invites Susan to a party at a fancy house where she admits to Susan that she spent time in jail for shoplifting. After drinking alcohol her ulcer flares up and Susan drives her to the hospital. Nicole does not have insurance so they use Susan's name and insurance to sign her in.

Susan takes medical leave from work and uses the time for a brief vacation. She calls the hospital for information about the patient checked in under her name but the staff refuses to give her any information. She calls her office to check her voicemail but is informed that "Susan Warfield" died in the hospital. She finds that her apartment has been rented and her belongings have been repossessed.

Susan learns that Nicole's body was taken from the hospital and cremated at a ceremony paid for by a man claiming to be her brother "Aaron Warfield" even though Susan has no brothers. Her ATM card is rejected so she takes a bus to Nicole's apartment and begins wearing her clothes. She learns that the death was due to a transfusion of the wrong type of blood and fears that she could be accused of manslaughter for having given incorrect medical information so she assumes Nicole's identity completely and visits the lawyer, who says that he is suing for $10 million for negligence and tells her where "Aaron Warfield" is staying in a hotel.

At the hotel, she finds the room of the wrong Warfield and encounters her own father Edgar Warfield, whom she has never met but recognizes from an old wedding photograph. Edgar confirms that "Aaron Warfield" is his son (therefore her half-brother) and warns her to stay away from him because he does not treat women well. She confronts him about the daughter he never knew and he says that he returned to town for her funeral and met up with Aaron, who was already in town. She leaves her phone number as "Nicole" and returns to the hospital, where she learns that a technician named Eddie Garcia was fired for entering the blood type as B− instead of A−, though Eddie argues that he saw someone watching him enter the computer access code and that person must have used it to change the data.

A police car turns on its sirens when it sees Susan driving Nicole's car because Nicole had a warrant due to several unpaid parking tickets. While escaping Susan nearly runs into a car driven by a pianist named Ron (Judge Reinhold), who shows great interest in the way she dresses and asks her to dinner. After dinner she finds that someone has broken into her apartment through the front door and Ron offers to stay in case the intruder returns. Susan tells him about the half-brother and lets him repair the door but does not let him stay the night so Ron sleeps out front in his car and catches a man snooping around the house in the night but the man escapes.

The next day Ron returns with groceries and they go to the hotel to get a picture of Aaron to show to Eddie Garcia. She is surprised that Ron is given the key to Aaron's room simply by asking for it. In the room Susan finds a picture of Edgar with a man she believes to be Aaron so they leave. She insists on showing the picture around the hospital alone while Ron goes to Eddie Garcia's apartment, where Ron explains that he can relate to Eddie because he was also fired from a hospital for stealing drugs. Eddie tries to escape, but Ron catches him and throws him off the fire escape to his death.

Ron picks Susan up from the hospital and drivers her to Eddie's place, where they find police surrounding the building and are told that Eddie committed suicide. The attorneys inform Edgar Warfield of the suicide and that the hospital is willing to settle because it appears to be an admission of guilt. Edgar calls Susan and arranges to meet her to scatter the ashes over the ocean before his flight departs.

Ron becomes suspicious because of Susan's avoidance of the police, so Susan invents a story for her new persona "Nicole" about being a convicted shoplifter. Ron urges her to confess more, but she convinces him to rush to the meeting with Edgar. On the ride there, he accuses her of using Susan for her money. She denies it, but he accuses her further of trying to shake down the family to get some of the insurance money, revealing that he is Aaron Warfield and caused the death of Susan because she refused to lend him money. He is also jealous of his father Edgar's closer relationship with his physical therapist Henry, the man shown in the photograph with him, and proposes that they join forces to take Edgar's money. Ultimately, Susan refuses to join him and runs over to Edgar, confessing to him that she is Susan. Completely losing it, Aaron declares his intention to kill both Susan and Edgar and get away with his crimes for good, and attempts to throw Susan off a cliff into the ocean. Edgar pulls them back from the brink and Aaron attempts to throw his father off the edge as well. Susan finally stops him by throwing Nicole's ashes in Aaron's eyes, blinding him, and as a result, Aaron himself ends up accidentally stumbling and falling off the edge of the cliff to his death. Susan loses her job but avoids felony charges and finally gets a chance to get to know her father.

Cast
 Crystal Bernard as Susan Warfield
 Judge Reinhold as Ron Holden/Aaron Warfield
 Traci Lords as Nicole Grace
 Carlos Carrasco as Eddie Garcia
 George Dickerson as Mr. Edgar Warfield
 Daniel McDonald as Thomas A. Rutherford
 Ivonne Coll as Mexican woman
 Scott Williamson as Dr. Sullivan
 Jerry Bernard as Funeral Director
 Thomas Prisco as Hospital Technician
 Daniel Shriver as Roger
 Myrna Niles as Mrs. Connor
 Kathleen Marshall as Crosswell Receptionist

Release
The British Board of Film Classification gave the film a PG rating without any cuts.

Reception
Tony Scott of Variety.com called the film "filled with possibilities longing to be realized" and complained that "San Diego is being used as L.A.’s stand-in."

Jon Abrams of dailygrindhouse.com called it "an entertaining little ride that works as a low-key version of Cohen’s ‘80s thrillers like SPECIAL EFFECTS and PERFECT STRANGERS."

In a negative review for obsessivemovienerd.com, Matt Wedge wrote, "As Good as Dead is obvious and mostly lackluster. But it’s also a sad project for what it represents: the final film written, produced, and directed by Larry Cohen."

References

External links
 
 
 

1995 television films
1995 films
1995 thriller films
1990s English-language films
1990s psychological thriller films
American psychological thriller films
American thriller television films
Films directed by Larry Cohen
Films shot in San Diego
Films with screenplays by Larry Cohen
USA Network original films
1990s American films